This article serves as an index – as complete as possible – of all the honorific orders or similar decorations awarded by Sarawak, classified by Monarchies chapter and Republics chapter, and, under each chapter, recipients' countries and the detailed list of recipients.

Awards

MONARCHIES

Governors of Sarawak 

 Abang Muhammad Salahuddin ( 3rd & 6th List of Yang di-Pertua Negeri of Sarawak 2 April 1977 – 2 April 1981 & since 22 February 2001 )  
  Grand Master of the Most Exalted Order of the Star of Sarawak
  Grand Master of the Order of the Star of Hornbill Sarawak
  Grand Master of the Order of Meritorious Service to Sarawak
  Grand Master of the Most Exalted Order of the Star of Sarawak
 Pingat Cemerlang Delima (PCD)
 Norkiah, his wife :
  Order of the Star of Hornbill Sarawak : Grand Master and Knight Grand Commander (DP) with title Datuk Patinggi 
 Pingat Cemerlang Delima (PCD)

 STATES of MALAYSIA

Governors of Malacca 

 Mohd Khalil Yaakob ( 6th Yang di-Pertua Negeri of Malacca since 4 June 2004 ) :
  Knight Grand Commander (Datuk Patinggi) of the Order of the Star of Hornbill Sarawak  (DP) with title Datuk Patinggi

Governors of Penang 

 Abdul Rahman Abbas (Governor of Penang :  - present) :
  Knight Grand Commander (Datuk Patinggi) of the Order of the Star of Hornbill Sarawak (DP) with title  	Datuk Patinggi

Governors of Sabah 

To be completed if any ...

Kelantan Royal Family 
 Ismail Petra of Kelantan, Sultan Muhammad V of Kelantan's father and retired Sultan for illness :
  Knight Grand Commander (Datuk Patinggi) of the Order of the Star of Hornbill Sarawak  (DP) with title Datuk Patinggi
 Darjah Paduka Seri Sarawak (DPSS)

To be completed if any new decorations for :

To be completed if any other ...

 ASIAN MONARCHIES

To be completed if any ...

 EUROPEAN MONARCHIES

To be completed if any ...

REPUBLICS 

To be completed if any ...

See also 
 Mirror page : List of honours of the Governors of Sarawak by country

References 

 
Sarawak